An antiviral stockpile is a reserve supply of essential antiviral medications in case of shortage.  Many countries have chosen to stockpile antiviral medications against pandemic influenza.  Because of the time required to prepare and distribute an influenza vaccine, these stockpiles are the only medical defense against widespread infection for the first six months.  The stockpiles may be in the form of capsules or simply as the active pharmaceutical ingredient, which is stored in sealed drums and, when needed, dissolved in water to make a bitter-tasting, clear liquid.

There are no evidence-based guidelines to guide the use of these stockpiled drugs, and plans are based on assumed similarities to seasonal influenza.  The most common antivirals are neuraminidase inhibitors, which, if begun during the first 48 hours after symptoms appear, will reduce the duration of seasonal influenza by about one day.  Taken before symptoms appear, it may prevent disease in about three-quarters of people treated prophylactically.  Currently, this is recommended in institutionalized elderly people and other high-risk groups as a form of post-exposure prophylaxis during seasonal influenza outbreaks.  However, since pandemic influenza differs somewhat from normal seasonal influenza, it is not clear that these drugs will prove either safe or effective for their intended purpose.

For a person that has very recently been exposed to seasonal influenza, effective post-exposure prophylaxis generally requires taking a drug like oseltamivir for seven to ten days, at half the daily dose needed for treatment.  A person that is repeatedly exposed, such as hospital staff members, may require continuous treatment throughout the duration of the outbreak in a community.  Based on experience with seasonal influenza in nursing homes, control of influenza requires full treatment of any ill persons and prophylactic treatment of all their contacts.  In a pandemic situation, before a vaccine becomes available, this level of treatment and medical prevention may require providing drugs to 80% of the people in an affected community.  Consequently, very large supplies of the drugs must be made available — much larger supplies than could be produced on demand.  Stockpiles are generally arranged in advance by government health authorities, due to fear of shortages and an awareness of manufacturing limitations during an outbreak.

Supplies in each country

List of available treatments of antiviral per country.

References

Anti-influenza agents
Lists of countries